Cwm Doethie – Mynydd Mallaen is a Site of Special Scientific Interest in Ceredigion and Carmarthenshire,  mid Wales.
Contained within it is the Allt Rhyd y Groes national nature reserve designated principally because of its sessile oak woodland clinging to near vertical cliffs of the River Doethie gorge.

References

See also
 Mynydd Mallaen
List of Sites of Special Scientific Interest in Ceredigion

Sites of Special Scientific Interest in Ceredigion
National nature reserves in Wales